Ernesto O. Domingo (born June 28, 1930) is a National Scientist of the Philippines and professor emeritus at the University of the Philippines College of Medicine at UP Manila. Dr. Domingo is a specialist in hepatology and gastroenterology. He organized the UPM Liver Study Group and undertook important investigations of viral hepatitis and liver disease, establishing a causal link between chronic hepatitis-B and liver cancer. His study has saved millions of individuals from life-threatening illness and decreased health care expenditures by identifying the preventive approach to liver cancer. 

He has fought for hepatitis vaccine to be made mandatory and available to all, as he is worried about the poor's access to health care. He has also successfully advocated for a bill that provides annual fiscal assistance for neonatal hepatitis immunization by working closely with politicians. He has received the 2013 Ramon Magsaysay Award for his work.

References

1930 births
Living people
National Scientists of the Philippines
Ramon Magsaysay Award winners
Academic staff of the University of the Philippines
People from Manila
University of the Philippines Manila alumni